Dniprelstan is a village (a selo) in the Zaporizhzhia Raion (district) of Zaporizhzhia Oblast in southern Ukraine. Its population was 417 in the 2001 Ukrainian Census. Administratively, it belongs to the Volodymyrivske Rural Council, a local government area.

The settlement was founded in 1929 as Dniprostroivka; in 1965 it was renamed to Dniprelstan.

References

Populated places established in 1929
Populated places established in the Ukrainian Soviet Socialist Republic

Zaporizhzhia Raion
Villages in Zaporizhzhia Raion